Trevarna was an electoral division of Cornwall in the United Kingdom. Between 1985 and 2005, a division called Trevarna elected one member to Cornwall County Council. Between 1983 and 2003, a division of the same name returned three members to sit on Restormel Borough Council.

Councillors

Cornwall County Council

Restormel Borough Council

Election results

Cornwall County Council

1985 election

1989 election

1993 election

1997 election

2001 election

References

Electoral divisions of Cornwall County Council
St Austell